The 1869 Youghal by-election was fought on 11 May 1869.  The by-election was fought due to the election of the Liberal incumbent MP, Christopher Weguelin, being voided due to bribery.  Weguelin had won the seat in the 1868 general election.

It was won by another Liberal candidate Montague John Guest.

References

Youghal
By-elections to the Parliament of the United Kingdom in County Cork constituencies
1869 elections in the United Kingdom
May 1869 events
1869 elections in Ireland